This is a list of media that showcase clay animation, and is divided into three sections: film (both short and feature-length), television (both series and made-for-television films), and music videos. For a list of stop motion films in general, please go here.

In film

In television

In music videos

References

Animation techniques
Stop motion
 List
Clay animation